The 1946 Ohio gubernatorial election was held on November 5, 1946. Republican nominee Thomas J. Herbert defeated Democratic incumbent Frank Lausche with 50.64% of the vote.

Primary elections
Primary elections were held on May 7, 1946.

Democratic primary

Candidates
Frank Lausche, incumbent Governor
Joseph Torok Jr.

Results

Republican primary

Candidates
Thomas J. Herbert, former Ohio Attorney General
Albert Edward Payne

Results

General election

Candidates
Major party candidates
Thomas J. Herbert, Republican 
Frank Lausche, Democratic

Other candidates
Arla A. Albaugh, Socialist Labor

Results

References

1946
Ohio
Gubernatorial
November 1946 events in the United States